Static lift may refer to:

For an aerostat: 
Buoyancy, the lifting force of the gas
For an aerodyne:  
Lift (force), the lifting force generated by the wings
Lift (soaring), rising air used by soaring birds and gliders

See also
Dynamic soaring, a flying technique used to gain energy by repeatedly crossing the boundary between air masses of significantly different velocity